Historic Royal Palaces is an independent charity that manages some of the United Kingdom's unoccupied royal palaces.

These are:

 Tower of London
 Hampton Court Palace
 Kensington Palace (State Apartments and Orangery)
 The Banqueting House, Whitehall
 Kew Palace with Queen Charlotte's Cottage
 Hillsborough Castle

Historic Royal Palaces was originally set up in 1989 as an executive agency of the Department of the Environment. In 1998 it became an independent charity, which is contracted by the Secretary of State for Culture, Media and Sport to manage the palaces on behalf of 'The King in Right of Crown'. It receives no funding from the Government or the Crown, depending on the support of visitors, members, donors, volunteers and sponsors. 4.25 million people visited the palaces in the 2014–15 financial year.

Occupied royal palaces, such as Buckingham Palace and Windsor Castle, are maintained by the Royal Household Property Section, and some are open to the public.

The organisation is jointly curated by Lucy Worsley and Tracy Borman.

The current Chief Executive is John Barnes, who has been in place since 2017.

See also
List of British royal residences
Tales from the Palaces

References

 
Conservation in England
 
Department for Digital, Culture, Media and Sport
Public corporations of the United Kingdom with a Royal Charter
Royal residences in England
1998 establishments in the United Kingdom
Charities based in England
Heritage organisations in the United Kingdom